Jenny Nimmo (born 15 January 1944) is a British author of children's books, including fantasy and adventure novels, chapter books, and picture books. Born in England, she has lived mostly in Wales for 40 years. She is probably best known for two series of fantasy novels: The Magician Trilogy (1986–1989), contemporary stories rooted in Welsh myth, and Children of the Red King (2002–2010), featuring schoolchildren endowed with magical powers. The Snow Spider, first of the Magician books, won the second annual Nestlé Smarties Book Prize and the 1987 Tir na n-Og Award as the year's best originally English-language book with an authentic Welsh background. The Stone Mouse was highly commended for the 1993 Carnegie Medal. Several others of hers have been shortlisted for children's book awards.

Biography
Jenny Nimmo was born in Windsor, England. She was an only child, and her father died when she was five. She was a voracious reader as a child, which led her to write her own stories to share with friends.

After working for a time in theatre, Nimmo spent several years with the BBC, partly on adapting other writers' stories for television, including 40 episodes (eight "stories") for Jackanory readings. Her first book, The Bronze Trumpeter, began life as a television script. It was published by Angus & Robertson in January 1975.

That year, Nimmo married David Wynn Millward, a Welsh artist and illustrator. Their two daughters and one son were born between 1975 and 1980. She currently lives in Wales, sharing her time between writing and helping her husband with a summer art school.

Millward is the writer or illustrator of a few published books himself, including four collaborations with Nimmo (1994–2000, marked ‡ below). Nimmo and their younger daughter Gwen Millward have collaborated on one picture book written by Jenny and illustrated by Gwen, The Beasties (Egmont UK, 2010). Gwen's first published book as both writer and illustrator was Bear and Bird (Egmont, September 2012).

Writer

Charlie Bone and the Red King
Her best-known work may be Children of the Red King, also known as the Charlie Bone series or Red King series, in which Charlie Bone's magical talent embroils him in the sinister intrigues of his new school. By 2006 Charlie Bone titles had been published in nine foreign-language editions. Translations into eleven other languages were in progress.
Originally it was the Red King Quintet after which Nimmo contracted for a new trilogy. The story climaxes in the fifth book and again in the eighth. Recently there is a new Red King series.

Publications
<div class="noprint">

Non-fiction
An Interview with Jenny Nimmo by Wendy Cooling (London: Mammoth Books, 1999)

Short stories
"Centuries of Stories"
"Sisters"
"Take Your Knee Off My Heart"
"The Animals' Bedtime Story"
"Your Late Dad"

Picture books
The Bears Will Get You (1990)
The Starlight Cloak (1990)
The Witches and the Singing Mice (1993)
Gwion and the Witch (Gwasg Gomer Legends from Wales, 1996)
Branwen (Gomer Legends from Wales, 1997)
Esmeralda and the Children Next Door (1999)
The Strongest Girl in the World (2001)
Something Wonderful (2001)
Pig on a Swing (2003)
The Beasties (2010), illustrated by Nimmo's daughter Gwen Millward

Chapter books
Box Boys
The Box Boys and the Bonfire Cat (1999)
The Box Boys and the Dog in the Mist (1999)
The Box Boys and the Fairground Ride (1999)
The Box Boys and the Magic Shell (1999)
Delilah
Delilah and the Dogspell (1991)
Delilah and the Dishwasher Dogs (1993)
Delilah Alone (1995)
Other illustrated books
Tatty Apple (1984)
The Red Secret (1989)
Jupiter Boots (1990)
The Stone Mouse (1993)
The Breadwitch (1993)
Wilfred's Wolf (1994) ‡
Ronnie and the Giant Millipede (1995)
Granny Grimm's Gruesome Glasses (1995) ‡
The Witch's Tears (1996)
The Alien on the 99th Floor (1996)
Hot Dog, Cool Cat (1997) ‡
Seth and the Strangers (1997)
The Owl Tree (1997)
The Dragon's Child (1997)
The Dog Star (1999)
Toby in the Dark (1999)
Ill Will, Well Nell (2000) ‡
The Bodigulpa (2001)
Tom and the Pterosaur (2001)
Beak and Whisker (2002)
Matty Mouse (2003)
The Night of the Unicorn (2003)
Invisible Vinnie (2003)

Novels
Children of the Red King

There are eight books in the series, all first published by Egmont Press in British trade paperback editions with cover art by David Wyatt.
Midnight for Charlie Bone (2002)
The Time Twister (2003)
The Blue Boa (2004)
The Castle of Mirrors (2005)
Charlie Bone and the Hidden King (2006)
Charlie Bone and the Wilderness Wolf (2007)
Charlie Bone and the Shadow of Badlock (2008)
Charlie Bone and the Red Knight (2009)
Five volumes have variant titles in the United States.
Chronicles of the Red King
The Secret Kingdom (2011)
The Stones of Ravenglass (2012) 
Leopards' Gold (Egmont, August 2013)
’ Novels linked to the ‘Children of the Red King’ Series’
‘’Henry and the Guardians of the Lost’’ (2016)
‘’Gabriel and the Phantom Sleepers’’ (2018)
The Magician Trilogy

In Britain this series has been published in one volume entitled The Snow Spider Trilogy.
‘’The Snow Spider (1986)Emlyn's Moon (1987); first US title, Orchard of the Crescent MoonThe Chestnut Soldier (1989)
Other novelsThe Bronze Trumpeter (Angus & Robertson, 1975)Ultramarine (1990)Rainbow and Mr Zed (1992), sequel to UltramarineGriffin's Castle (1994)The Rinaldi Ring (1999)Milo's Wolves (2001)

‡ Four 55- to 64-page books are illustrated by Nimmo's husband David Wynn Millward (1994 to 2000).
</div>

AdaptationsThe Snow Spider'' and its sequels were adapted for television by the screenwriter Julia Jones, as three miniseries that HTV aired 1989 to 1991. The series introduced Osian Roberts as Gwyn Griffiths with Siân Phillips as grandmother Nain Griffiths, Robert Blythe and Sharon Morgan as his parents, and Gareth Thomas as Mr. Llewellyn.

See also

Notes

References

External links

Jenny Nimmo at Internet Book List 
Jenny Nimmo at Fantastic Fiction —with many cover images 
Jenny Nimmo at Random House Australia —bibliog. data including cover images for RHA editions 

1944 births
British children's writers
Welsh fantasy writers
People from Windsor, Berkshire
Living people